William Greene Binney (October 22, 1833 – August 3, 1909) was an American attorney known for his avocation as a malacologist, working mostly during the second half of the nineteenth century. He was responsible for volumes 4 and 5 of The Terrestrial Air-Breathing Mollusks of the United States, a task he took over from his father, Amos Binney, and collaborator, Augustus Addison Gould. The ninety engraved plates which were part of volume 5, illustrating most of the then known land mollusk fauna, are particularly noteworthy.

Binney's obituary in the New York Times included the following information:

Taxa
Taxa named in honor of Binney include:
 Nesovitrea binneyana  (E. S. Morse, 1864)

Bibliography 
 The terrestrial air-breathing mollusks of the United States, and the adjacent territories of North America''
 Binney W. G. (1859) Volume 4
 Binney W. G. (July 1878) Volume 5. Plates.

References

External links
Chronology of Science in the United States, including reference to some of Binney's work
 

1833 births
1909 deaths
Writers from Boston
19th-century American zoologists
American malacologists
Harvard University alumni